Frisco Sal is a 1945 American Western film directed by George Waggner and starring Susanna Foster and Turhan Bey. It was co written by Curt Siodmak.

Cast
 Susanna Foster as Sally
 Turhan Bey as Dude
 Alan Curtis as Rio 
 Andy Devine as Bunny
 Thomas Gomez as Dan
 Collette Lyons as Mickey
 Samuel S. Hinds as Doc
 Fuzzy Knight as Hallelujah
 Billy Green as Billy

Production
The film was originally called Frisco Kate and was to star Foster and Ella Raines'.

Filming started in September 1944.

References

External links
 
 
 Review of film at The New York Times
 Frisco Sal at BFI

1945 films
American Western (genre) musical films
Films directed by George Waggner
Universal Pictures films
Films set in San Francisco
Films set in the 19th century
1940s historical musical films
American historical musical films
1940s Western (genre) musical films
American black-and-white films
1940s English-language films
1940s American films